The 2007 ICC World Twenty20 was the inaugural Twenty20 International cricket world championship, contested in South Africa from 11 to 24 September 2007. Twelve teams took part in the thirteen-day tournament—the ten Test-playing nations and the finalists of the 2007 WCL Division One tournament: Kenya and Scotland. India won the tournament, beating Pakistan in the final.

Rules and regulations

During the group stage and Super Eight, points were awarded to the teams as follows:

In case of a tie (i.e., both teams score exactly the same number of runs at the end of their respective innings), a bowl-out decided the winner. This was applicable in all stages of the tournament. The bowl-out was used to determine the result of only one game in this tournament – the Group D game between India and Pakistan on 14 September (scorecard).

Within each group (both group stage and Super Eight stage), teams were ranked against each other based on the following criteria:
 Higher number of points
 If equal, higher number of wins
 If still equal, higher net run rate
 If still equal, lower bowling strike rate
 If still equal, result of head-to-head meeting.

Qualification

By finishing first and second in the 2007 WCL Division One, Kenya and Scotland qualified for the World Twenty20.

Venues
All matches were played at the following three grounds:

Groups

Group A
 
 
 

Group B
 
 
 

Group C
 
 
 

Group D

Squads

Group stage
The 12 participant teams were divided into four groups of three teams each. The groups were determined based on the rankings of the teams in Twenty20 as of 1 March 2007. The top two teams from each group went through to the second stage of the tournament.

All times given are South African Standard Time (UTC+02:00)

Group A

Group A saw the only exit of a seeded team when the West Indies were eliminated after losing both their matches. Their first loss came after Chris Gayle's record 117 runs was not enough to prevent South Africa from winning and Bangladesh also winning against West Indies.

Group B

Group B started with World Champions Australia being defeated by Zimbabwe, Brendan Taylor scored 64 (not out) and saw the Africans home with one ball to spare.

Group C

In the first match Kenya scored the lowest Twenty20 International total of 73 against New Zealand and went on to lose with 12.2 overs and 9 wickets to spare. Kenya's fate was sealed when they allowed Sri Lanka to post a Twenty20 world record of 260 in the group's second match. Kenya were then bowled out for 88 and lost by a record 172 runs.

Group D

India and Pakistan played in the first ever World Twenty20 bowl-out. India's bowlers defeated Pakistan 3–0.

Super 8s

This tournament's Super Eight format was designed such that the top 2 seeds from each group was pre-decided at the start of the tournament. The actual performance of the team in the Group Stage played no role in determining if the team qualified into Super Eight Group E or F. For example, in Group C, though Sri Lanka finished with more points than New Zealand, for the purpose of the Super Eight groupings, New Zealand retained the group's top seed position (C1) while Sri Lanka retained the group's second seed position (C2).

In case a third-seeded team qualified ahead of the two top-seeded teams, it took on the seed of the eliminated team. This only happened in Group A, where Bangladesh (original seed A3) qualified ahead of West Indies (original seed A2) and therefore took on the A2 spot in Group F. The other seven top seeds qualified.

The eight teams were divided into two groups of four teams each. The two top teams from each Super Eight group qualified for the semi-finals.

Group 1

Group 2

Knockout stages

Semi-finals

Final

India won the toss and chose to bat on what was considered to be a traditionally batsman-friendly pitch at the Bullring. Umar Gul took the wickets of both Yuvraj Singh and Mahendra Singh Dhoni, leaving India with 157/5 in 20 overs; only Gautam Gambhir (75 from 54 balls) produced a notable innings. A 21-run over from Sreesanth swung the game towards Pakistan. However, Irfan Pathan (3/16), RP Singh (3/26) and Joginder Sharma (2/20) slowed the scoring dramatically. With Pakistan needing 54 from 24 balls, Misbah-ul-Haq hit 3 sixes off Harbhajan Singh in one over. Sreesanth was also dispatched for 2 sixes but took the wicket of Sohail Tanvir, as Pakistan went into the last over needing 13 runs to win, with only 1 wicket remaining. Joginder Sharma bowled a wide first ball, followed by a dot ball. Misbah followed by taking six off a full-toss; Pakistan needed just 6 runs to win from the last four balls. Misbah attempted to hit the next ball with a paddle-scoop over fine leg, but he only managed to sky the ball, and it was caught at short fine-leg by Sreesanth, leaving Pakistan all out for 152 runs. Irfan Pathan was awarded the Man of the Match for his spell, which included 3 wickets for 16 runs, including that of Man of the Series, Shahid Afridi.

Champions

Statistics 
The leading run-scorer in the tournament was Matthew Hayden, with 265 runs, and the highest wicket-taker Umar Gul with 13 wickets.
The top-five in each category are:

Most runs

Most wickets

Match officials

The umpires were selected from the Elite Panel of ICC Umpires and the ICC International umpire panel and the referees from the Elite Panel of ICC Referees.

Media coverage
Coverage of the 2007 ICC World Twenty20 was as follows:
Television networks

Africa — Supersport (Live)
Australia — Fox Sports (Live)
Australia — Nine Network
Bangladesh — Bangladesh Television(In group stage 2 Bangladesh match only) (Live)
Canada — Asian Television Network (Live)
Caribbean  – Caribbean Media Corporation (Live)
India — ESPN (Live) – English
India — STAR Cricket (Live) – Hindi
Jamaica – Television Jamaica (Live)
Middle East  – Ten Sports (Live)
New Zealand — SKY Network Television (Live)
Pakistan — GEO Super (Live)
Pakistan – Pakistan Television Corporation (Live)
Sri Lanka — Sirasa Network (Live)
United Kingdom — Sky Sports (Live)
United States — DirecTV CricketTicket (Live)

Radio Networks

Africa – All Jazz Radio
Australia – Australian live radio
Bangladesh – DhakaFM
Canada – CBC radio one
Caribbean; Radio airplay
India – All India Radio
Jamaica – Radio Jamaica Limited
Middle East – Top Fm radio
New Zealand – Radio pacific
Pakistan – Radio Pakistan
Sri Lanka – Radio Sri Lanka, Sinhala Radio Service
United Kingdom – BBC Radio 5 Live
United States – WHTZ-FM – Z-100

References

External links
 Recent rule changes for Twenty20 Cricket.   Follow the link to download a .pdf file of ALL the rules

Official Website

 
ICC World Twenty20
ICC Men's T20 World Cup
Twenty20
Cricket
ICC World Twenty20